Munich is a city in Cavalier County, North Dakota, United States. The population was 190 at the 2020 census. The City was named after Munich, Germany.

History
Munich was founded in 1904 and is named after Munich, Germany.

Geography
Munich is located at  (48.669516, -98.835677).

Demographics

2010 census
As of the census of 2010, there were 210 people, 100 households, and 61 families residing in the city. The racial makeup of the city was 99.5% White and 0.5% from two or more races.

There were 100 households, of which 21.0% had children under the age of 18 living with them, 59.0% were married couples living together, 1.0% had a female householder with no husband present, 1.0% had a male householder with no wife present, and 39.0% were non-families. 37.0% of all households were made up of individuals, and 15% had someone living alone who was 65 years of age or older. The average household size was 2.10 and the average family size was 2.77.

The median age in the city was 50.4 years. 21.4% of residents were under the age of 18; 3.4% were between the ages of 18 and 24; 18.6% were from 25 to 44; 32.4% were from 45 to 64; and 24.3% were 65 years of age or older. The gender makeup of the city was 52.4% male and 47.6% female.

2000 census
As of the census of 2000, there were 268 people, 112 households, and 73 families residing in the city. The population density was 436.3 people per square mile (169.6/km2). There were 124 housing units at an average density of 201.9 per square mile (78.5/km2). The racial makeup of the city was 97.76% White, 0.37% from other races, and 1.87% from two or more races. Hispanic or Latino of any race were 0.75% of the population.

There were 112 households, out of which 28.6% had children under the age of 18 living with them, 60.7% were married couples living together, 3.6% had a female householder with no husband present, and 34.8% were non-families. 33.9% of all households were made up of individuals, and 20.5% had someone living alone who was 65 years of age or older. The average household size was 2.39 and the average family size was 3.01.

In the city, the population was spread out, with 28.0% under the age of 18, 1.9% from 18 to 24, 22.8% from 25 to 44, 25.7% from 45 to 64, and 21.6% who were 65 years of age or older. The median age was 44 years. For every 100 females, there were 88.7 males. For every 100 females age 18 and over, there were 89.2 males.

The median income for a household in the city was $25,156, and the median income for a family was $38,125. Males had a median income of $21,750 versus $19,375 for females. The per capita income for the city was $16,849. About 6.3% of families and 11.4% of the population were below the poverty line, including none of those under the age of eighteen and 12.3% of those 65 or over.

Education
Munich is served by the Munich Public School District, located in Munich. The two schools in the district are Munich Elementary School and Munich High School.

Notable people

 Quentin Burdick, U.S. Senator (1960–1992)
 Martin Tabert, farmworker from Munich who was charged and convicted of vagrancy in Leon County, Florida, after being discovered riding a train without a ticket in December of 1921. Tabert was later leased to a lumber mill in Dixie County, where he was subsequently whipped to death by a mill foreman in February 1922. Public outcry following his death brought about the end of convict leasing by county jails in Florida.

Climate
This climatic region is typified by large seasonal temperature differences, with warm to hot (and often humid) summers and cold (sometimes severely cold) winters.  According to the Köppen Climate Classification system, Munich has a humid continental climate, abbreviated "Dfb" on climate maps.

References

External links
 Munich Public School District
 A short history of Munich, western Cavalier County, North Dakota (1958?) from the Digital Horizons website

Cities in Cavalier County, North Dakota
Cities in North Dakota
German-American culture in North Dakota
Populated places established in 1904
1904 establishments in North Dakota